The 1962 Iraq Central FA Altruism Cup was the 1st edition of the Iraq Central FA Perseverance Cup. The match was contested between the winners and runners-up of the 1961–62 edition of the Iraq Central FA League, Al-Quwa Al-Jawiya and Al-Kuliya Al-Askariya respectively. Al-Quwa Al-Jawiya won the game 4–2.

Match

Details

References

External links
 Iraqi Football Website

Football competitions in Iraq